A Single Body is a short drama film, directed by Sotiris Dounoukos and released in 2014. The film centres on David (Mexianu Medenou) and Wani (Doudou Masta), two workers in an slaughterhouse whose dreams of opening their own butcher shop are threatened by the arrival of new coworker Patate (Garba Tounkara).

The film premiered in August 2014 at the Melbourne International Film Festival. In September it was screened at the 2014 Toronto International Film Festival, where it was named the winner of the award for Best International Short Film. In 2015 it was screened at the Sydney Film Festival, where it was the winner of the Dendy Live Action Short Award.

References

External links

2014 films
2014 short films
Australian drama short films
French drama short films
Greek short films
2010s Australian films
2010s French films
2010s French-language films